"Dream On" is a song recorded by Japanese singer Naoya Urata of the band AAA. It features vocals from the singer-songwriter Ayumi Hamasaki. The song was released as a single on December 22, 2010. The song is Hamasaki's first collaboration since 2001's "A Song is Born" (with Keiko). Moreover, this is Hamasaki's 26th consecutive song to reach the summit and 39th number-one single overall.

Track listing

Charts

References

External links
 

Ayumi Hamasaki songs
2010 singles
Oricon Weekly number-one singles
Songs written by Ayumi Hamasaki
2010 songs
Avex Trax singles